rFactor is a computer racing simulator designed with the ability to run any type of four-wheeled vehicle from street cars to open wheel cars of any era. rFactor aimed to be the most accurate race simulator of its time. Released in November 2005, rFactor did not have much competition in this market, but it featured many technical advances in tire modeling, complex aerodynamics and a 15 degrees of freedom physics engine.

rFactor was developed by Image Space Incorporated (ISI), which has been developing simulators since the early 1990s for both commercial and military purposes. The isiMotor2 on which the game is based is a direct successor to the engine used in previous titles developed by ISI, most notably F1 Challenge '99–'02, released through EA Sports. The isiMotor2 engine was also used in many other simulation games, and in rFpro.

Gameplay 
rFactor has a detailed interface during offline race sessions or online games, allowing players to control the mechanical setup of their cars, chat to other players and enter the racing arena in their vehicle. The player's car can be driven from multiple viewpoints, but the two most popular are termed the cockpit view (from the driver's eye) and swingman view (above and behind the vehicle).

General consensus dictates that a steering wheel will provide the best performance gameplay wise, though a joystick or even keyboard can be used. The keyboard is also used for some actions, like requesting pit service and adjusting brake bias. This is analogous to buttons on modern racing car steering wheels and most computer wheels have buttons that can be mapped to keystrokes. The player can jump directly from the racetrack to the control interface by pressing the escape key (ESC), or entering their pit box. Most, if not all, inputs are able to be mapped to the players choosing.

Modding 
In addition to the stock vehicles and circuits available in rFactor, a steady stream of unofficial mods has become available. A large number of modifications were released, including ones that recreated seasons from Formula One, NASCAR, IndyCar and V8 Supercars. Cars from the racing games Forza Motorsport, Need for Speed: Shift, Shift 2 Unleashed, Simulador Turismo Carretera, Top race 2009 Simulator, TC2000 Racing and Test Drive Unlimited were also converted into rFactor with the mod Shift Street. With the release of the SDK, many new venues were created and released as unofficial addons to the game. Many of the circuits for rFactor were converted from other games, including GTR, GT Legends, TOCA Race Driver, Grand Prix 4 and Grand Prix Legends.

Development 

rFactor is an evolution of F1 Challenge '99–'02, but without the licensing of Formula One circuits and teams. As such, rFactor'''s initial release only included four fictitious circuits (seven as of v1.087), with about a dozen layouts within these facilities and there were about six vehicle classes, including two open wheel and four sedan classes. Among its most notable features was a rich interface for creating custom game contents, which made it possible for amateurs to create additional vehicles and tracks for the game. On August 1, 2006, ISI released the full update, with many changes and new features, including the new 2006 BMW Sauber F1 and a much requested manual. Another notable and often requested feature was driver-swapping, which allowed to change drivers during the race, enabling up to 24 hour events like Le Mans.

A feature was added to allow the AI to "learn a track", which teaches the AI the ideal way to drive a particular circuit. As of v1.150, the AI was improved, leading to notably faster driving styles. On January 25, 2007, version 1.250 was released. On October 12, 2007, a patch was released that brought the version to 1.255 build F. rFactor also advertises an advanced tire model, aiming to be much better than the Pacejka model previously used in most simulators. rFactors tire model simulates a non-linear tire use cycle according to temperature and wear.

F1 Challenge proved to be popular for online racing over the Internet through GameSpy, which allowed any player to find available games. rFactor has extended this in several ways. The central server is handled by ISI themselves, so finding other games is effectively the same. However, the central server will show all races and practice sessions over a web interface known as Racecast. There are also career statistics available for registered drivers. The game server can be run from a dedicated program, free from the need to render graphics. It can run mixtures of human and computer controlled (AI) vehicles.

In an evolution from F1 Challenge, the circuits now include all layouts at a particular facility, which greatly reduces the need to duplicate track geometry. The game can easily accommodate different sorts of vehicles and games between multiple classes of vehicles are possible. rFactor also has a plugin-interface for third-party addons to hook in, which allows for features like screen-overlays or radio chatter.

On March 2, 2015, rFactor was also released on the Steam distribution service, with an updated version n. 1255G that introduced some new features.Marcel Offermans rFactor: Full Steam Ahead!, at planetmarrs.net, March 2, 2015

 Reception 

In the first review of rFactor, published on AutoSimSport, Jon Denton stated: "What the tire model in rFactor does very well is that it models the relationship between slip angle, self aligning torque and cornering force - and it does this better than anything that has come before".

Writing on HonestGamers, Paul Josua concluded: "It's a little unfair to hold rFactor'''s lack of accessibility against it as it has clearly set out to be a simulation racer. It does a fine job of that, but those who don't demand flawless simulation are better served looking elsewhere".rFactor was a finalist for PC Gamer USs "Best Racing Game 2005" award, which ultimately went to GTR: FIA GT Racing.

Sequel 
In March 2009, ISI announced the development of rFactor 2, which includes weather effects, reflections and accurate shadows on a variety of textures. It was released on March 28, 2013.

See also 
 ARCA Sim Racing '08
 GT Legends'
 GTR 2 – FIA GT Racing Game' NASCAR Racing 2003 Season rFactor 2 Simraceway References 

 External links 
 
 Interview with rFactor developer Gjon Camaj of ISI'', Inside Sim Racing, Feb 29, 2008

2005 video games
Racing simulators
Racing video games
Video games developed in the United States
Windows games
Windows-only games
Image Space Incorporated games